The 5th FINA World Open Water Swimming Championships were held May 3–8, 2008 in Seville, Spain. The races were held on a 2.5-kilometer loop-course in the Guadalquivir river in the city center.

A total of 165 swimmers (81 females, 84 males) were entered into the 6 races at the 2008 Open Water Worlds:
Saturday, May 3: women's 10K
Sunday, May 4: men's 10K
Tuesday, May 6: women's 5K, men's 5K
Thursday, May 8: women's 25K, men's 25K

The 10K races served as the initial qualifier for the 10K race at the 2008 Olympics.

Results

Team standings
The Championship Trophy point standing for the 2008 Open Water Worlds is:

The following 17 countries are listed in a tie for 22nd, with zero (0) points: 

 

 FYR Macedonia

See also
Open water swimming at the 2007 World Aquatics Championships (previous Worlds)
2008 Olympics: Women's 10K and Men's 10K
Open water swimming at the 2009 World Aquatics Championships (subsequent Worlds)
2008 in swimming

References

FINA World Open Water Swimming Championships
FINA Open Water Worlds
2008 in Spanish sport
International aquatics competitions hosted by Spain
Swimming competitions in Spain